Prince (19582016) was an American singer, songwriter, record producer, dancer, actor and filmmaker. He is widely regarded as one of the greatest musicians of all-time. A multi-instrumentalist who was considered a guitar virtuoso, he was well known for his eclectic work across multiple genres, flamboyant and androgynous persona, and wide vocal range which included a far-reaching falsetto and high-pitched screams.

Academy Awards

|-
| 1985 || "Purple Rain" || Best Original Song Score ||

American Music Award

|-
| rowspan="2" | 1984 || Prince || Favorite Soul/R&B Male Artist || 
|-
| 1999 || Favorite Soul/R&B Album || 
|-
| rowspan="10" | 1985 || rowspan="4" | Prince || Favorite Pop/Rock Male Artist || 
|-
| Favorite Pop/Rock Male Video Artist || 
|-
| Favorite Soul/R&B Male Artist || 
|-
| Favorite Soul/R&B Male Video Artist || 
|-
| rowspan="4" | "When Doves Cry" || Favorite Pop/Rock Single || 
|-
| Favorite Pop/Rock Video || 
|-
| Favorite Soul/R&B Single || 
|-
| Favorite Soul/R&B Video || 
|-
| rowspan="2" | Purple Rain || Favorite Pop/Rock Album || 
|-
| Favorite Soul/R&B Album || 
|-
| rowspan="3" | 1986 || rowspan="3" | Prince || Favorite Pop/Rock Male Artist || 
|-
| Favorite Soul/R&B Male Artist || 
|-
| Favorite Soul/R&B Male Video Artist || 
|-
| 1987 || "Kiss" || Favorite Soul/R&B Single || 
|-
| rowspan="2" | 1990 || rowspan="2" | Prince || Favorite Soul/R&B Male Artist || 
|-
| Achievement || 
|-
| 1992 || Prince || Favorite Soul/R&B Male Artist || 
|-
| rowspan="2" | 1995 || rowspan="2" | Prince || Favorite Soul/R&B Male Artist || 
|-
| Merit || 
|-
| rowspan="2" | 2004 || Prince || Favorite Soul/R&B Male Artist || 
|-
| Musicology || Favorite Soul/R&B Album || 
|-
| 2016 || Purple Rain || Favorite Soundtrack ||

ASCAP Pop Music Awards

!Ref.
|-
| rowspan=4|1986
| "Raspberry Beret"
| rowspan=11|Most Performed Songs
| 
| rowspan=4|
|-
| "I Feel for You"
| 
|-
| "Purple Rain"
| 
|-
| "When Doves Cry"
| 
|-
| 1987
| "Kiss"
| 
| 
|-
| 1989
| "U Got the Look"
| 
| 
|-
| rowspan=2|1991
| "Nothing Compares 2 U"
| 
| rowspan=2|
|-
| "Kiss"
| 
|-
| 1992
| "Round and Round"
| 
| 
|-
| 1994
| "The Most Beautiful Girl in the World"
| 
| 
|-
| 2004
| "'03 Bonnie & Clyde"
| 
|

American Society of Composers, Authors and Publishers

|-
| 1990
| Partyman (from Batman)
| Most Performed Songs from Motion Pictures
| 
|-
| 1991
| Thieves in the Temple (from Graffiti Bridge)
| Most Performed Songs from Motion Pictures
|

BET Awards

|-
| 2005 || Prince || Best Male R&B Artist || 
|-
| 2006 || Prince || Best Male R&B Artist || 
|-
| 2010 || Prince || Lifetime Achievement Award ||

Billboard Music Award

!Ref.
|-
||1994
||Prince
| Top R&B Singles Artist - Male
| 
|
|-
| 2013 || Prince || Icon Award || 
|-
| rowspan="3" | 2017 || rowspan="2" | Prince || Top Billboard 200 Artist || 
|-
| Top Song Sales Artist || 
|-
| Purple Rain || Top Soundtrack/Cast Album ||

Brit Awards

|-
| rowspan="2" | 1985 || Purple Rain || Soundtrack/Cast Recording || 
|-
| rowspan="3" | Prince || International Artist || 
|-
| 1989 || International Male Solo Artist || 
|-
| rowspan="3" | 1990 || International Solo Artist || 
|-
| "Batdance" || British Video of the Year || 
|-
| Batman || Soundtrack/Cast Recording || 
|-
| 1991 || rowspan="6" | Prince || International Male Solo Artist || 
|-
| 1992 || rowspan="2" | International Solo Artist || 
|-
| 1993 || 
|-
| 1995 || rowspan="3" | International Male Solo Artist || 
|-
| 1996 || 
|-
| 1997 ||

Boston Society of Film Critics Awards

|-
| style="text-align:center;"| 2016
| Sign 'o' the Times
| Best Rediscoveries
| 
|}

Classic Pop Readers' Awards

!Ref.
|-
| 2020
| 1999
| Reissue of the Year
| 
|

Edison Awards

!Ref.
|-
| 1987
| Parade
| rowspan=2|Best Pop International
| 
|
|-
| 1989
| Lovesexy
| 
|

GAFFA Awards (Denmark)

!Ref.
|-
| 1991
| "Cream"
| Best Foreign Song
| 
|rowspan=2|
|-
| 2004
| Prince
| Best Foreign Male Act
|

Golden Globe Award

|-
| 1985 || "When Doves Cry"  || Best Original Song || 
|-
| 2007 || "The Song of the Heart"  || Best Original Song ||

Golden Raspberry Awards

|-
| 1985 || "Sex Shooter" || Worst Original Song || 
|-
| rowspan="3" | 1987 || rowspan="2" | Under the Cherry Moon || Worst Actor || 
|-
| Worst Director || 
|-
| "Love or Money" || Worst Original Song || 
|-
| rowspan="2" | 1990 || rowspan="2" | Under the Cherry Moon || Worst Actor of the Decade || 
|-
| Worst New Star of the Decade || 
|-
| rowspan="3" | 1991 || rowspan="3" | Graffiti Bridge || Worst Actor || 
|-
| Worst Director || 
|-
| Worst Screenplay || 
|-
| 2000 || Prince || Worst Actor of the Century ||

Grammy Award

|-
| rowspan="2" | 1984 || "International Lover" || Best Male R&B Vocal Performance || 
|-
| 1999 || Best Male Pop Vocal Performance || 
|-
| rowspan="5" | 1985 || rowspan="3" | Purple Rain || Album of the Year || 
|-
| Best Rock Performance by a Duo or Group with Vocal || 
|-
| Best Score Soundtrack for Visual Media || 
|-
| "I Feel for You" || Best R&B Song || 
|-
| Prince & The Revolution || Producer of the Year, Non-Classical || 
|-
| 1986 || Prince and the Revolution: Live || Best Music Film || 
|-
| rowspan="2" | 1987 || rowspan="2" | "Kiss" || Best R&B Performance by a Duo or Group with Vocals || 
|-
| Best R&B Song || 
|-
| rowspan="3" | 1988 || Sign o' the Times || Album of the Year || 
|-
| rowspan="2" | "U Got the Look" || Best R&B Performance by a Duo or Group with Vocals || 
|-
| Best R&B Song || 
|-
| rowspan="4" | 1990 || Batman || Best Male Pop Vocal Performance || 
|-
| "Batdance" || Best Male R&B Vocal Performance || 
|-
| "Partyman" || Best Song Written for Visual Media || 
|-
| Prince || Producer of the Year, Non-Classical || 
|-
| 1991 || "Nothing Compares 2 U" || Song of the Year || 
|-
| 1992 || "Gett Off" || Best R&B Performance by a Duo or Group with Vocals || 
|-
| 1993 || "Diamonds and Pearls" || Best Pop Performance by a Duo or Group with Vocals || 
|-
| 1995 || "The Most Beautiful Girl in the World" || Best Male Pop Vocal Performance || 
|-
| rowspan="2" | 1996 || "I Hate U" || Best Male R&B Vocal Performance || 
|-
| The Gold Experience || Best R&B Album || 
|-
| 2004 || N·E·W·S || Best Contemporary Instrumental Album || 
|-
| rowspan="5" | 2005 || "Cinnamon Girl" || Best Male Pop Vocal Performance || 
|-
| rowspan="2" | "Call My Name" || Best Male R&B Vocal Performance || 
|-
| Best R&B Song || 
|-
| "Musicology" || Best Traditional R&B Performance || 
|-
| Musicology || Best R&B Album || 
|-
| rowspan="5" | 2007 || rowspan="2" | "Black Sweat" || Best Male R&B Vocal Performance || 
|-
| Best R&B Song || 
|-
| "Beautiful, Loved and Blessed" || Best R&B Performance by a Duo or Group with Vocals || 
|-
| "3121" || Best Urban/Alternative Performance || 
|-
| 3121 || Best R&B Album || 
|-
| rowspan="3" | 2008 || "Future Baby Mama" || Best Male R&B Vocal Performance || 
|-
| "The Song of the Heart"  || Best Song Written for Visual Media || 
|-
| 1999 || Hall of Fame || 
|-
| 2010 || "Dreamer" || Best Solo Rock Vocal Performance || 
|-
| 2011 || Purple Rain || Hall of Fame || 
|-
| rowspan="2" | 2017 || Hit n Run Phase Two || Best Engineered Album, Non-Classical || 
|-
| Sign o' the Times || Hall of Fame ||

MTV Europe Music Awards

!Ref.
|-
| 1994
| Himself
| Best Male
| 
|

MTV Video Music Award

|-
| 1985 || "When Doves Cry" || Best Choreography in a Video || 
|-
| 1986 || "Raspberry Beret" || Best Choreography in a Video || 
|-
| rowspan="4" | 1988 || rowspan="4" | "U Got the Look" || Best Male Video || 
|-
| Best Stage Performance in a Video || 
|-
| Best Choreography in a Video || 
|-
| Best Editing in a Video || 
|-
| 1989 || "I Wish U Heaven" || Best Special Effects in a Video || 
|-
| 1990 || "Batdance"  || Best Video from a Film || 
|-
| 1992 || "Cream" || Best Dance Video || 
|-
| 1993 || "7" || Best R&B Video || 
|-
| 2004 || "Musicology" || Best Male Video || 
|-
| 2006 || "Black Sweat" || Best Cinematography in a Video ||

Music & Media Year-End Awards

!Ref.
|-
| 1989
| Prince
| Male Artist of the Year
| 
|

Music Week Awards

!Ref.
|-
| 2021
| Prince
| Catalogue Marketing Campaign 
| 
|

NAACP Image Awards

|-
| style="text-align:center;"| 1984 || Purple Rain || Outstanding Actor in a Motion Picture || 
|}

NME Awards
The NME Awards were created by the NME magazine and was first held in 1953.

|-
| 1988
| "Sign o' the Times"
| Best Single
| 
|-
| 2018
| Purple Rain
| rowspan=2|Reissue of the Year
| 
|-
| rowspan=2|2020
| 1999
| 
|-
| The Beautiful Ones
| Best Music Book
|

Music Video Production Awards
The MVPA Awards are annually presented by a Los Angeles-based music trade organization to honor the year's best music videos.

|-
| 2005
| "Call My Name"
| Best R&B Video 
|

Pollstar Concert Industry Awards
The Pollstar Concert Industry Awards is an annual award ceremony to honor artists and professionals in the concert industry.

|-
| 1985
| rowspan=2|Purple Rain Tour
| Tour of the Year
| 
|-
| 1986
| Major Tour of the Year
| 
|-
| 1989
| Lovesexy Tour
| rowspan=2|Most Creative Stage Production
| 
|-
| rowspan=2|2005
| rowspan=2|Musicology Live 2004ever
| 
|-
| Major Tour of the Year
|

Premios Ondas

!Ref.
|-
| 2016
| Prince
| Special Jury Award
| 
|

Porin

!Ref.
|-
| 1994
| Diamonds and Pearls Video Collection
| Best International Video
| 
|

Rhythm and Blues Music Hall of Fame

|-
| 2016 || Prince || Singer Songwriter ||

Rober Awards Music Prize

!Ref.
|-
| 2014
| Prince
| Best Live Artist
| 
|
|-
| 2017
| Purple Rain
| Best Reissue
| 
|
|-
| 2018
| Piano and a Microphone 1983
| Best Compilation
| 
|
|-
| 2019
| 1999
| rowspan=2|Best Reissue
| 
|
|-
| 2020
| Sign o' the Times
| 
|

Rock and Roll Hall of Fame

|-
| 2004 || Prince || Performer ||

Soul Train Music Awards

|-
| 1987 || "Kiss" || Best R&B/Soul Single – Male || 
|-
| rowspan= "2" | 1988 || "U Got the Look" || Best R&B/Soul Single – Male || 
|-
| Sign o' the Times || Best R&B/Soul Album – Male || 
|-
| 1990 || "Batdance" || Best Video of the Year || 
|-
| rowspan= "2" | 1992 || Diamonds and Pearls || Best R&B/Soul Album – Group, Band or Duo || 
|-
| Prince || Heritage Award – Career Achievement || 
|-
| 1993 || Love Symbol Album || Best R&B/Soul Album – Group, Band or Duo || 
|-
| 1994 || The Hits/The B-Sides || Best R&B/Soul Album – Male || 
|-
| 1998 || Emancipation || Best R&B/Soul Album – Male || 
|-
| 2000 || Prince || Artist of the Decade for Extraordinary Artistic Achievements – Male || 
|-
| rowspan= "2" | 2005 || "Call My Name" || Best R&B/Soul Single – Male || 
|-
| Musicology || Best R&B/Soul Album – Male ||

Smash Hits Poll Winners Party

!Ref.
|-
| 1989
| rowspan=4|Prince
| rowspan=4|Best Male Solo Singer
| 
|
|-
| 1990
| 
|
|-
| 1991
| 
|
|-
| 1994
| 
|

UK Music Hall of Fame

|-
| 2006 || Prince || Lifetime Contribution to Music ||

Webby Awards

!Ref.
|-
| 2014
| 3rdeyegirl
| Web: Celebrity/Fan
| 
|
|-
| rowspan=2|2019
| Prince Discography
| Websites: Music
| 
|
|-
| "Mary Don't You Weep"
| Best Music Video
| 
|

World Soundtrack Awards

|-
| 2004 || Purple Rain || Major Contribution to the Art of Film Music and Sound ||

Žebřík Music Awards

!Ref.
|-
| 1996
| rowspan=4|Himself
| Best International Instrumentalist
| 
| 
|-
| rowspan=2|2004 
| Best International Male
|
| rowspan=3|
|-
| rowspan=2|Best International Personality
| 
|-
| 2005
| 
|-
| 2016
| Death of the Prince
| Best International Průser
| 
|

Honorary degrees
 Doctor of Humane Letters awarded June 9, 2016, by the University of Minnesota

References

Prince
Awards and nominations